Alexander Lutz (born 26 July 1973) is a retired German lightweight rower. He has won medals at a number of World Rowing Championships in lightweight quad scull (LM4x).

References 

1973 births
Living people
German male rowers
World Rowing Championships medalists for Germany